Oronzo Pugliese (5 April 1910 – 11 March 1990) was an Italian football manager from Turi in the Province of Bari.

Over the course of his career, Pugliese managed several notable clubs in Italian football, among them were; Roma, Fiorentina and his home province side Bari.

References

1910 births
1990 deaths
Sportspeople from the Metropolitan City of Bari
Italian football managers
Serie A managers
A.C.N. Siena 1904 managers
Bologna F.C. 1909 managers
A.S. Roma managers
S.S.C. Bari managers
ACF Fiorentina managers
Benevento Calcio managers
Association football midfielders
Italian footballers
Footballers from Apulia
Serie C players
A.S. Siracusa players
A.S. Siracusa managers